The Hebron Hills, also known as Mount Hebron, are a mountain ridge, geographic region, and geologic formation, comprising the southern part of the Judean Mountains. The Hebron Hills are located in the southern West Bank.

Geography

History

Iron Age 
The Book of Joshua mentions Maon, Carmel, Adora and Juttah among others as part of the tribal territory of the Tribe of Judah. The modern Arabic names of Ma'in, al-Karmil, Dura, and Yatta respectively preserve the ancient names.

As the Nabataeans pushed northwards, the Edomites were driven out of old Edom to the south of the Dead Sea and into the southern Hebron Hills between the southern part of the Dead Sea and the Mediterranean, establishing new Edom or Idumaea.

Hellenistic period 

During the Hellenistic period, the Edomites became the dominant population of the southern Hebron Hills. Under Ptolemaic rule, the area became a separate administrative unit known as Idumea, named after its inhabitants. Marisa became its administrative center, with Ziph and Adoraim being of secondary importance. 

Hellenistic rule brought Greek and Phoenician culture into Idumea, while the prevalence of male circumcision shows a growing affinity with Judaism.

In 113-112 BCE, the region was captured by the John Hyrcanus, who converted the Edomites to Judaism and incorporated Idumaea into the Hasmonean kingdom.

Roman period 
The region took part in the Bar Kokhva revolt against the Roman Empire (132-135 CE). The revolt left many settlements in the area destroyed or abandoned, with some of its residents immigrating to the Galilee.

In his Geography, written around 150 CE, Claudius Ptolemy describes Idumea as a desolate area, in contrast to the relative density in the rest of the country north of Idumea to the Galilee.

Late Roman and Byzantine period 
During the Late Roman and Byzantine period, the northern part of the Hebron Hills was inhabited by Christian settlements built on the ruins of destroyed Jewish villages. The southern Hebron Hills were inhabited by both Jews and Christians. During the same period, the southern Hebron Hills became known as Darom or Daroma (Aramaic and Hebrew for "South"). This term appears in rabbinic literature and in Eusebius' Onomasticon. 

In his Onomasticon, Eusebius mentions seven Jewish settlements that existed in his time in the southern Hebron Hills: Juttah, Carmel, Eshtemoa, Rimmon, Tele, Lower Anim and Ein Gedi. Archaeological finds confirm the existence of Jewish and Christian settlements in Yatta, al-Karmil, as-Samu, Zif, Maon, Kfar Aziz, Eaton, Gomer, Kishor, Tela, Rimon and Aristobolia. Jewish settlements were typically built surrounding a synagogue, with the synagogues of Eshtemoa, Maon, Susya and Anim being particularly notable. There is evidence that the region was also inhabited by pagans and Jewish Christians during that period.

Early Islamic period 
Following the Muslim conquest of the Levant, the Jewish population in the southern Hebron Hills had been gradually replaced by Muslims. During the early Islamic period, the synagogues of Susya and Eshtemoa were repurposed as mosques. It remains unclear whether local Jews had fled the area or had converted to Islam.

Some Palestinians residing in the Hebron Hills, most notably the Makhamras of Yatta, view themselves as having Jewish ancestry.

Crusader period
During the Crusades, at the time of the Kingdom of Jerusalem, all the Hebron Hills fell under the dominion of the seigneurie of St. Abraham.

1967 and after
In recent times, several areas where traditional Palestinian herding communities live have been declared restricted military zones, forcing the displacement of many families. Several Israeli settlements have been established over the terrain. The Israeli military administration regards the area as a high priority for enforcing demolition orders regarding Palestinian dwellings.

Flora and fauna
The Hebron Hills form the southern and eastern border of Mediterranean vegetation in the region of Palestine.

A 2012 survey by the Israel Nature and Parks Authority discovered 54 rare plant species in the region, more than half of them in cultivated fields. They include Boissiera squarrosa, a type of grass; Legousia hybrida, a plant from the bellflower family; and Reseda globulosa, a rare mignonette.

The region has been known for its vineyards since biblical times. Palestinians and Israelis (from both parts of the Green Line) continue to farm grapes in this region. Local wineries include Yatir Winery.

See also
 Hebron Governorate
 Har Hevron Regional Council
 Wildlife of Israel

References

Mountains of the West Bank